Gymnopilus hispidellus is a species of mushroom in the family Hymenogastraceae.

Description

Habitat and distribution
This species has been found growing scattered or subcespitose (with stems clumped together), on logs, in Cuba in March.

Phylogeny
Gymnopilus hispidellus  is in the aeruginosus-luteofolius infrageneric grouping.

See also

List of Gymnopilus species

References

External links
Gymnopilus hispidellus at Index Fungorum

hispidellus
Fungi of North America
Taxa named by William Alphonso Murrill